Ethmia ubsensis is a moth in the family Depressariidae. It was described by Zagulajev in 1975. It is found in Mongolia.

References

External links

Moths described in 1975
ubsensis